Tour of Nanjing is a men's one-day cycle race which takes place in China and was rated by the UCI as 1.2 and forms part of the UCI Asia Tour.

Overall winners

References

UCI Asia Tour races
Sport in Nanjing
2013 establishments in China